Snegiryovo is a rural locality (a selo) in Razdolyevskoye Rural Settlement, Kolchuginsky District, Vladimir Oblast, Russia. The population was 14 as of 2010. There are 3 streets.

Geography 
Snegiryovo is located on the Vorsha River, 30 km southeast of Kolchugino (the district's administrative centre) by road. Marino is the nearest rural locality.

References 

Rural localities in Kolchuginsky District